NBA Jam 99 is a basketball game for the Nintendo 64 and Game Boy Color, released in 1998 by Acclaim Entertainment's Acclaim Sports label and developed by Iguana West. New Jersey Nets forward Keith Van Horn appeared on the cover. Acclaim was unable to secure the license to use Michael Jordan's name or likeness, and as such he was not available as a player for the Chicago Bulls. A player named Roster Guard is available in his place. Rosters are accurate as of July 1, 1998. The game also features Kevin Harlan on play-by-play with Bill Walton as the color commentator. The Utah Jazz' Dan Roberts provides the arena announcing.

Gameplay
The Nintendo 64 version of NBA Jam 99 features 5-on-5 play, replacing NBA Jams typically 2-on-2 play. (Acclaim had initially announced that the game would have modes for both 5-on-5 and 2-on-2 play.) The Game Boy Color version more traditionally retains the 2-on-2 play.

Development
The game was showcased at E3 1998.

Reception

The Nintendo 64 version received "favorable" reviews, while the Game Boy Color version received "mixed" reviews, according to the review aggregation website GameRankings.

Notes

References

External links

1998 video games
1999
Game Boy Color games
NBA Jam
Nintendo 64 games
Video games developed in Australia
Torus Games games
Multiplayer and single-player video games
Video games developed in the United States